Corpus Christi College is the regional seminary (and theologate) of the Roman Catholic dioceses in Victoria and Tasmania, Australia. The seminary is administered by a board of episcopal trustees comprising the archbishops of Melbourne and Hobart, the bishops of Ballarat, Sandhurst and Sale, and the auxiliary bishops of Melbourne. The Archbishop of Melbourne is the permanent chair of the trustees.

Educational scope
Corpus Christi College presently trains priests for the archdioceses of Melbourne and Hobart and the dioceses of Ballarat, Sandhurst and Sale, as well as the Archdiocese of Adelaide, South Australia; the Archdiocese of Canberra, Australian Capital Territory; the Diocese of Bathurst, New South Wales; the Military Ordinariate of Australia; and the Archdiocese of Hanoi and the Diocese of Vinh in Vietnam. The college attracts male seminarians from Vietnam, the Philippines, India, Sri Lanka, Korea and Myanmar.

The college is located at St George's Church in Carlton, near St Patrick's Cathedral and in proximity to Catholic Theological College, the University of Melbourne and the Australian Catholic University campuses. St George's Church was built in 1855 and, after a long career as a school, now serves as the seminary chapel.

Former colleges
 Corpus Christi, Werribee (built 1923, sold 1973)
 Corpus Christi, Glen Waverley (built 1959, sold 1972), now the Victoria Police Academy (and for years known to former seminarians as "Coppers Christi")
 Corpus Christi, Clayton (occupied 1973-1999)

Gallery

See also

 Roman Catholic Church in Australia

External links
 

Seminaries and theological colleges in Australia
Catholic seminaries
Educational institutions established in 1923
1923 establishments in Australia
Buildings and structures in the City of Melbourne (LGA)